Edward Kobina Enninful  (born 22 February 1972) is an English editor-in-chief of British Vogue and European editorial director of Condé Nast. He was appointed a  fashion director of British fashion magazine i-D at the age of 18, a position he held for more than two decades. He subsequently held the positions of Contributing Fashion Editor at Vogue Italia and American Vogue, as well as Creative Fashion Director at W magazine. Enninful was appointed editor-in-chief of British Vogue in 2017.

Early life 
Edward Enninful was born in Ghana, the fifth of six children to Major Crosby Enninful of the Ghanaian Army. In 1985 after the coup d'état which deposed military leader and President Ignatius Kutu Acheampong, the family emigrated to Ladbroke Grove, London. His mother worked as a seamstress, and inspired him with the vividly patterned colours and fabrics she used while creating clothing for her British-Ghanaian friends.

At the age of 16, Enninful was spotted on a train by stylist Simon Foxton. A few weeks later, he was shooting with Foxton at his house, along with Nick Knight, a founder-photographer of i-D. By the age of 17, he had been introduced to Trish and Terry Jones, founder of i-D magazine, and soon began assisting i-D fashion director Beth Summers. He finished college, earning a degree at Goldsmiths, University of London while juggling with his modeling career and assisting on shoots with Foxton and Summers. Summers left the magazine a few weeks after Enninful's 18th birthday, and Terry Jones gave Enninful the position.

Career

i-D magazine 
At the age of 18, Enninful's position as fashion director at i-D made him the youngest ever fashion director for an international publication. He quickly became known for his edgy elegance, which ultimately became his trademark. Much of his inspiration came from the streets: "We British have to customize our clothes, we have to be more creative, informing who you are—and I am still obsessed with the streets." The looks he featured in his stories helped fuel the grunge movement during the early 1990s.

For the March 2009 issue of i-D Magazine, Enninful styled "The Best British" cover story by photographer Sølve Sundsbø. The issue printed 12 separate covers, each featuring one of twelve British supermodels, including Jourdan Dunn, Kate Moss, Susie Bick, Naomi Campbell, Stella Tennant, Eliza Cummings, Alice Dellal, Daisy Lowe, Twiggy, Yasmin Le Bon, Lily Donaldson, and Agyness Deyn.

Italian Vogue 
In 1998, Enninful became a contributing editor to Italian Vogue. According to Enninful, working with Vogue Italia editor-in-chief Franca Sozzani and photographer Steven Meisel propelled him to mature as a stylist. "I always say that I was a London stylist but when I worked with Steven, I became a proper stylist."

Among his achievements at Italian Vogue, perhaps the most notable project Enninful spearheaded during his time at the publication was the production of its "Black Issue". The "Black Issue" featured only black models, including Naomi Campbell, Jourdan Dunn and Alek Wek to showcase and celebrate black models and black women in the worlds of art, politics and entertainment. He described his intention as ending the "white-out that dominates the catwalks and magazines". The issue was so successful that it sold out in the U.S. and U.K. within 72 hours, leading Condé Nast to print an additional 40,000 copies.

Enninful also styled the magazine's highly publicized June 2011 cover editorial, "Belle Vere", which exclusively featured plus sized models including Tara Lynn, Candice Huffine, and Robyn Lawley.

American Vogue 
In 2006, Enninful became contributing fashion editor for American Vogue. He can be seen in the documentary "The September Issue".

W magazine 
In 2011, Enninful was tapped to take the style directorship at W, a high-end Condé Nast title that had struggled in the late 2000s. Under Enninful's direction, W generated considerable attention for its riskier editorial, including the March 2012 cover shot by Steven Klein featuring Kate Moss depicted as a nun as well as another cover featuring singer Nicki Minaj dolled up as an 18th-century French courtesan. For the magazine's November 2011 art issue, Enninful collaborated with Steven Meisel on a series of fake advertisements that ran throughout the magazine, including one that featured a drag queen contestant from RuPaul's Drag Race named Carmen Carrera hawking a fictitious fragrance called La Femme.

While the magazine was suffering in 2010, amid a brutal recession and competition from V magazine and Interview magazine, W began showing signs of life after Enninful's takeover. The magazine's ad pages went up 16.7 percent by May 2012, with 453 pages compared to 388 pages for the same period the year before, according to Media Industry Newsletter—the biggest year-over-year gain among fashion titles. Editorial Director Stefano Tonchi told The New York Times that Enninful was a big part of that success.

British Vogue 
Enninful was confirmed as the new editor-in-chief of British Vogue on 10 April 2017, making him the first black editor-in-chief of the magazine. Condé Nast International chairman and chief executive Jonathan Newhouse announced him as the successor to Alexandra Shulman, calling Enninful "an influential figure in the communities of fashion, Hollywood and music which shape the cultural zeitgeist", adding that "by virtue of his talent and experience, Edward is supremely prepared to assume the responsibility of British Vogue".

Since Enninful took the creative reins, he has aimed to reshape a century-old publication and transform it into a contemporary fashion platform that is more reflective of the current global audience. His efforts have led to a 51 percent increase in digital traffic since he took over in 2017 and led to signing 140 new advertisers. Furthermore, while other publications, including American Vogue, reduced frequency during the 2020 pandemic, British Vogue remained financially stable and continued to produce 12 thick issues.

For his first issue, Enninful made a bold statement of what the "New Vogue" would be like by featuring British mixed-race model and feminist activist Adwoa Aboah as the cover star. Covers since have featured the likes of Beyoncé, Oprah Winfrey, Rihanna, Judi Dench (at 85, British Vogues oldest cover star), Madonna and soccer player Marcus Rashford. The September 2019 edition, which was guest-edited by Meghan, Duchess of Sussex, featured on the cover 15 female changemakers, including Greta Thunberg and Jane Fonda. The issue was a quick sell-out and, according to estimates provided by Condé Nast Britain, the release of the September cover in the first 24 hours alone, generated more than double the entire PR value of Enninful's previous successful September issue, featuring pop star Rihanna.

Under Enninful, British Vogue has waded into political territory as well. In response to comments on immigrants in the United States by President Donald Trump, Enninful created the moving video project I Am An Immigrant, gathering huge names from the worlds of fashion, music, and film to show the vital creative input of people who are immigrants in the US.

For the September 2020 issue, Enninful commissioned Misan Harriman, the first Black male photographer to shoot a British Vogue cover in its 104-year history. Enninful then enlisted Kennedi Carter, who became the youngest photographer in British Vogue's history to shoot a cover story for the magazine.

Enninful champions diversity both on and off the pages of British Vogue. Famously, his predecessor Alexandra Shulman, employed an all-white editorial team to support the publication. Since Enninful has taken the helm, the team is 25 percent people of color. To continue his efforts to bring more diversity to the team who help shape the content of the publication, Enninful has begun reaching out to local schools, cultivating the talent pool in digital media and trying, with his presence, to change the presumptions about who is welcome at Vogue House.

Advertising 
Along with his editorial work, Enninful has been instrumental in shaping the vision of numerous advertising campaigns and runway shows for some of the most influential international fashion houses. To date, he has consulted for Comme des Garçons, Christian Dior, Dolce and Gabbana, Celine, Lanvin, Mulberry, Giorgio Armani, Valentino, Jil Sander, Calvin Klein, Fendi, Alessandro Dell'Acqua, Gucci, Hugo Boss and Missoni, among others.

To celebrate the 25th anniversary of Enninful's career, he collaborated with Beats by Dre and Nick Knight (photographer) to create a limited-edition line of headphones with an accompanying video entitled "The Seven Deadly Sins of Edward Enninful". The film featured 8 supermodels  – Kate Moss (lust), Naomi Campbell (pride), Karlie Kloss (greed), Lara Stone and Anna Ewers (gluttony), Maria Carla Boscono (sloth), Karen Elson (wrath) and Jourdan Dunn (envy) and screened on the Beats by Dre billboard in Times Square in 2016.

In 2017, Enninful made his directorial debut in a collaboration with the American brand GAP to celebrate diversity and promote optimism. Enninful enlisted a diverse cast spanning many industries, including Wiz Khalifa, Priyanka Chopra, Adwoa Aboah, Maria Borges, Christie Brinkley, Miles Chamley-Watson, Jonathan Groff and Alek Wek, and featured the stars singing along to "Sunny" by Boney M. According to GAP the goal of the video, titled "Bridging the Gap", was "to show unity and individuality existing in tandem".

Personal life 
On 22 February 2022, Enninful married his long-term partner Alec Maxwell on his 50th birthday at Longleat House in Wiltshire.

Enninful's memoir A Visible Man was published in September 2022. It was "Book of the Week" on BBC Radio 4, read by the author.

Recognition
 The Black Alumni of Pratt Celebration of the Creative Spirit Award (2012)
 National Magazine Feature Photography Award 2013: "Good Kate, Bad Kate" by Steven Klein] (2013)
 New York Urban League's Frederick Douglass Medallion Award (2014)
 BRAG Business Achievement Award (2014)
 British Fashion Awards: Isabella Blow Award for Fashion Creator (2014) 
 Clio Excellence in Commercial Styling Award (2015)
 Appointed Order of the British Empire for services to diversity in the fashion industry (2016)
 Attitude Magazine’s Man of the Year (2018)
 AMFAR Courage Award (2018)
 CFDA Media Award (2018)
 Daily Front Row Magazine of the Year (2019)
 BOF Global Voices Award (2019)
 Named 6th most powerful black man in Britain in the Powerlist 2020 ranking, having made the Top 10 in both 2018 and 2019.
 PPA Editor of the Year (2020)
 PPA Diversity Initiative of the Year (2020)
 BSME British Society of Magazine Editors – Editor's Editor Award (2020)
 British Fashion Awards 2020 Changemakers Award
 Named 5th on the 2021 15th edition of the Powerlist rankings, after reaching the Top 10 for four years running
 BSME British Society of Magazine Editors 2021 for Editor of the Year
 British Fashion Awards for Leader of Change (2021)
 The Prince's Trust Global Ambassador (2021)
 British LGBT Awards: Global Media Trailblazer (2022)

References 

1972 births
Living people
Alumni of Goldsmiths, University of London
British magazine editors
British Vogue
English people of Ghanaian descent
Fashion editors
Fashion stylists
Gay models
Ghanaian emigrants to England
LGBT Black British people
LGBT models
Ghanaian LGBT people
Naturalised citizens of the United Kingdom
Officers of the Order of the British Empire
People from the Royal Borough of Kensington and Chelsea